There is also a Logan Medal of the arts, awarded by the Chicago Arts Institute.
The Logan Medal is the highest award of the Geological Association of Canada. Named after Sir William Edmond Logan, noted 19th-century Canadian geologist. It is presented annually to an individual for sustained distinguished achievement in Canadian earth science.

Recipients

Source: Geological Association of Canada

See also

 List of geology awards

References

Canadian science and technology awards
Geology awards
Awards established in 1964
1964 establishments in Canada